Advocate Rajendra Suryaprasad Trivedi, also known as Rajubhai Vakil, is the Cabinet Minister of Gujarat and the former Speaker of Gujarat Legislative Assembly and was the Minister of Gujarat for Sports, Youth and Cultural activities department (Independent charge) and Pilgrimage Development in Vijay Rupani Ministry.

He is the serving MLA from Raopura of Vadodara District, Gujarat.

He was re elected in 2017 Gujarat Assembly Election from Raopura (Vidhan Sabha constituency) with a margin of more than 40000 votes.

References

1954 births
Gujarat MLAs 2012–2017
Living people
State cabinet ministers of Gujarat
Bharatiya Janata Party politicians from Gujarat
Speakers of the Gujarat Legislative Assembly